Sälinkää is a village in the Mäntsälä municipality in Uusimaa, Finland, with over 200 inhabitants. The north-south road 1471 from Hausjärvi to Mäntsälä passes through the village. Lake Kilpijärvi is located near Sälinkää.

The Sälinkää village has largely been built in the immediate vicinity of the historic Sälinkää Manor. Today, the manor operates as a reservation restaurant, where various events are organized. Other village services include two schools, Sälinkää School and Lukko School, one kindergarten, and a volunteer fire department. There was also a general store in the village before, which stopped operating in June 2022.

The provincial government of Uusimaa named Sälinkää the Uusimaa village of the year in 2008.

See also
 Mäntsälä (village)
 Oitti
 Hyvinkää

Sources

Further reading

References

External links
 Sälinkää's location at Fonecta

Mäntsälä
Villages in Finland